The Western Flyers were a New Zealand netball team which represented most of the Central, Southern and Eastern North Island in the National Bank Cup. The team was formed in 1998 and played all ten seasons of the competition. At the end of the 2007, the Flyers merged with the Capital Shakers to form the Central Pulse, one of five New Zealand teams in the ANZ Championship, which commenced in 2008.

Franchise
The Flyers franchise was based in New Plymouth, Whanganui, Napier and Palmerston North. The franchise recently amalgamated the Eastern Netball Region (which is an amalgamation of Napier, Hastings, Gisborne, Wairoa, Central Hawke's Bay and Dannevirke Netball).

Notable players
 Daneka Wipiiti, current Silver Fern, Flyer, Force and now playing for Southern Sting
 Joanne Morgan, former Australian international, Flyers 2004-2005 (Import)
 Danielle Harvey, former Australian international, 2005 (Import)

2007 Squad
Abbie Bailey-Nowell
Amber Bellringer
Lauren Burgess
Candyce Edwards
Malu Faasavalu
Jodi Hikauroa
Hannah Kelly
Rebecca Kupa
Amanda Palmer
Lana Phipps
Hayley Stockman
Brooke Williams

Competition Record
2007- 8th
2006- 8th
2005- 7th
2004- 8th
2003- 9th
2002- 8th 
2001- 6th 
2000- 8th 
1999- 8th
1998- 7th

References
http://www.netballnz.co.nz/default.aspx?s=nbank_team_flyers

Defunct netball teams in New Zealand
National Bank Cup teams
North Island
Sports clubs established in 1998
Sports clubs disestablished in 2007
1998 establishments in New Zealand
2007 disestablishments in New Zealand
Central Pulse